UICC may refer to: 
 Universal integrated circuit card, also known as a SIM card
 Union for International Cancer Control, non-governmental organization for tackling cancer
 University of Illinois at Chicago Circle, see University of Illinois at Chicago